The 1001: A Nature Trust, whose contributors are sometimes referred to as The 1001 Club, is a financial endowment that helps fund the World Wide Fund for Nature. It was established in 1970 by the then head of the WWF, Prince Bernhard of the Netherlands, with help from Anton Rupert, a South African entrepreneur.

Foundation 
According to the WWF, in 1970, the then and first President of WWF International, Prince Bernhard of the Netherlands, launched an initiative that was to provide WWF with a solid financial base. WWF set up a US$10 million fund, known as "The 1001: A Nature Trust". When WWF was seeking to raise the US$10 million Anton Rupert proposed to WWF Prince Bernhard the idea of finding a thousand individuals to make contributions of $10,000 each. Together with Rupert Prince Bernhard developed the concept of the 1001 Club in 1970 to help WWF cover it overheads costs.

Rupert, a lifelong friend of Prince Bernhard, was generally regarded as South Africa's leading Afrikaner businessman, the founder and chairman of the Rembrandt tobacco company, the head of Rothmans International, and one of the richest men in South Africa. In the earlier part of his career, Rupert was closely associated with the Afrikaner Broederbond, the Afrikaner nationalist secret society. At the suggestion of Prince Bernhard (in 1968) to found a South African national branch of the WWF, Rupert set up the South African chapter of the WWF, the Southern African Nature Foundation (SANF), of which he became the president, persuading South African businessmen to join its board of trustees. Rupert also served as a trustee of WWF International for 22 years, until 1990, in spite of a provision in the organisation's original incorporation documents that limited members to two three-year terms. So influential did Rupert become in the inner circles of the WWF, that he was able to provide the organisation with the director general of its international headquarters in Switzerland. In or shortly before 1971, while Prince Bernhard was still the President of WWF International, Rupert suggested providing Prince Bernhard with a personal assistant, seconded to work at WWF International headquarters while his salary was still paid by his parent company. Rupert proposed the services of Charles de Haes, an executive of Rupert's Rothmans International company. In 1971 de Haes was commissioned to work alongside Prince Bernhard in order to establish a permanent endowment for WWF International and reach the operations's $10 million goal. De Haes carried out this assignment successfully in the early 1970s and was appointed Joint Director General of WWF-International in 1975 and then sole Director in General in 1977 or 1978, a post he occupied until 1993.

According to the WWF, "since establishing The 1001, WWF International has been able to use interest from the trust fund to help meet its basic administration costs". The establishment of a permanent endowment for WWF International aimed at permitting the international headquarters of the WWF to be financially independent of its national sections. The funds raised through the 1001 Club would enable the WWF's international headquarters to assure potential donors that their money would not be used for headquarters' administrative expenses, since these were already largely assured by the endowment. As one of its consequences this arrangement made WWF International financially independent of the national WWF sections worldwide.

Composition 
Membership of the 1001 Club is confidential. WWF refuses to give information about the members of the club. In a series of articles in the British magazine Private Eye details of some of the members were anonymously published in 1980 and 1981. A copy of the membership list of the 1001 Club for 1987 in the possession of the historian Stephen Ellis confirmed many of the published allegations. Names of the members "that have slipped out over the years include Baron von Thyssen, Fiat boss Gianni Agnelli, and Henry Ford, as well as politicians such as Mobutu Sese Seko of Zaire, the former president of the International Olympic Committee Juan Samaranch, and beer baron Alfred Heineken".

The British journalist Kevin Dowling — who made a documentary on ivory poaching that had the support of WWF but who later fell out with the organisation over Operation Lock — discovered two lists, one for 1978 and one for 1987 which suggest that some cross-fertilisation between the various networks in which Prince Bernhard was involved took place and contributed to finding suitable candidates for the 1001-Club.

Many of the 1001 Club members consisted of persons from the banking sector, other business sectors, intelligence, the military and heads of states. A number of the 1001 Club members were part of the South African business sector, that was the subject of international sanctions during apartheid. Therefore, particular linkages existed between (parts of) the global elite network and wildlife conservation through the presidency of Prince Bernhard of WWF International as well as explicit links of WWF International to South Africa in the field of environmental philanthropy.

Prince Bernhard himself was member number 1001 of the 1001 Club.

Criticisms 
In his book At the Hand of Man: Peril and Hope for Africa's Wildlife Raymond Bonner criticized the WWF on charges of neocolonialist methods. In her review of his book, Ann O'Hanlon of the Washington Monthly, who called Bonner's charges a "thorough indictment of WWF", wrote: "The secret list of members includes a disproportionate percentage of South Africans, all too happy in an era of social banishment to be welcomed into a socially elite society. Other contributors include businessmen with suspect connections, including organized crime, environmentally destructive development, and corrupt African politics. Even an internal report called WWF's approach egocentric and neocolonialist. (The report was largely covered up.)"

According to Stephen Ellis, who sought to demonstrate the influence of the white South Africa lobby in the financing of WWF International, most known members of the 1001 Club were "people of irreproachable integrity, although members of the 1001 Club include a small number of disreputable individuals such as President Mobutu Sese Seko of Zaire and Agha Hasan Abedi, former president of the Bank of Credit and Commerce International (BCCI), responsible for the biggest fraud in world financial history." Both Mobutu and Abedi were members of the 1001 Club known for the year 1987 at least. Ellis and Gerrie ter Haar (2004) described the WWF's 1001 Club as "an association where European royalty rubs shoulders with leading industrials but also with some distinctly dubious figures from the worlds of grand corruption and secret intelligence". According to them the ostensibly non-political body WWF gave access to elite connections of a type, that means that "membership of elite international networks and societies" enabled African leaders "to link global elites in a discretion they find congenial" as witnessed by President Mobutu's 1001 Club membership. In this context Ellis and ter Haar regard as key attraction of secret societies that "membership provides opportunities for doing political deals unobserved by the mass of the population and for forming bonds of solidarity that go beyond the ordinary" and state that "secrecy binds people together".

Ellis also stressed, that "the identities of the 1,001 members of the 1001 Club reflect quite closely Bernhard's own circle of acquaintances". According to Ellis they also revealed "the influence of
leading South African personalities". The available 1987 membership list included at least 60 South Africans including prominent members of the Afrikaner Broederbond, who were at the top of companies which had depended on the patronage of the Broederbond, such as Johannes Hurter (chairman of Volkskas), Etienne Rousseau (chairman of the Federale mining and industrial group), and Pepler Scholtz (former managing director of the Sanlam financial group). The 1001 Club was particularly popular with South African business executives during apartheid, allowing them to network and do business internationally while bypassing international sanctions. At least three South African 1001 Club members had been implicated in the Muldergate Scandal in South Africa, wherein it was revealed that the Pretoria government had used secret service funds to buy control of newspapers. One of them, Louis Luyt, who played a prominent part in the scandal, was a former business partner of Anton Rupert.

Conspiracy theories 
The 1001 Club has given rise to various conspiracy theories in books and internet forums, possibly promoted by the lack of publicly available membership lists and information about the 1001 Club's meetings. Ramutsindela et al. (2011) emphasize in this context, that "one of the biggest dangers in writing about the type of elite networks and initiatives is that readers may accuse the authors of creating, participating or contributing to conspiracy theories".

References

Further reading 
  Vintage Books ed., .

External links
WWF International: History

Environmental organisations based in the Netherlands
Financial endowments
Organizations established in 1970
Neocolonialism